Saint-Edmond-de-Grantham is a municipality in the Centre-du-Québec region of Quebec. The population as of the Canada 2021 Census was 804.

Demographics 

Population trend:

Mother tongue language (2021)

See also
List of municipalities in Quebec

References 

Municipalities in Quebec
Incorporated places in Centre-du-Québec